The Yellowhead Bridge is a road bridge in Prince George, British Columbia. It carries Highway 16 over the Fraser River. It was completed in 1988.

See also
 List of crossings of the Fraser River
 List of bridges in Canada

References

Road bridges in British Columbia
Buildings and structures in Prince George, British Columbia
Bridges over the Fraser River
Bridges completed in 1988